The Floridas was a region of the southeastern United States comprising the historical colonies of East Florida and West Florida. They were created when England obtained Florida in 1763 (see British Florida), and found it so awkward in geography that she split it in two. The borders of East and West Florida varied. In 1783, when Spain acquired West Florida and re-acquired East Florida from Great Britain through the Peace of Paris (1783), the eastern British boundary of West Florida was the Apalachicola River, but Spain in 1785 moved it eastward to the Suwannee River.   The purpose was to transfer the military post at San Marcos de Apalachee (now St. Mark's) and the surrounding district from East Florida to West Florida. From 1810 to 1813, the United States extended piecemeal control over the part of West Florida that comprised the modern-day Gulf coasts of Alabama and Mississippi and the Florida Parishes of Louisiana. After the ratification of the Adams-Onis Treaty in 1821 the United States combined East Florida and what had been the remaining  Spanish-controlled rump of West Florida into the territory that comprised modern-day Florida.

See also
The Californias
The Canadas
The Carolinas
The Dakotas
The Virginias

References

Divided regions
Pre-statehood history of Florida
West Florida